Dalmate was a  74-gun ship of the line of the French Navy.

Career 
Ordered on 11 August 1806, Dalmate was one of the ships built in the various shipyards captured by the First French Empire in Holland and Italy in a crash programme to replenish the ranks of the French Navy.

She was commissioned in 1808 and served under Captain Le Jaulne. She was decommissioned in 1813, and her crew transferred to Friedland.

At the Bourbon Restoration, she was renamed Hector, changed to Dalmate during the Hundred Days, and to Hector back again after Napoléon's second abdication. She later served under Captain Baron Lemarant between 15 May to 22 June 1817, and Bergeret from 13 September, cruising the Caribbean and returning to Rochefort on 4 February 1818.

Notes, citations, and references

Notes

Citations

References
 

Ships of the line of the French Navy
Téméraire-class ships of the line
1808 ships